Justasons Corner is a Canadian unincorporated community in Charlotte County, New Brunswick. It was named after Justus Justason, who was a loyalist from New Jersey.

The community is grouped around C K Justason Lane where it crosses Route 176.

History

Notable people

See also
List of communities in New Brunswick

References

Communities in Charlotte County, New Brunswick